Michael Francis A'Hearn (November 17, 1940 – May 29, 2017) was an American astronomer and astronomy professor at the University of Maryland College of Computer, Mathematical, and Natural Sciences. He was also the principal investigator for NASA's EPOXI mission.

Career 

He received his B.A. in science at Boston College and his Ph.D. in Astronomy at the University of Wisconsin–Madison. He was the principal investigator for the NASA Deep Impact mission. He aided in the development of systems for surveying abundances in comets as well as techniques for determining the sizes of cometary nuclei which uses optical and infrared measurements.

His studies focused on comets as well as asteroids and he also supervises numerous graduate students. He was an elected fellow of the AAAS. He authored over 100 papers published in journals and was also an avid sailor who had a commercial coast guard license.

In June 1986, the main-belt asteroid 3192 A'Hearn, discovered by American astronomer Edward Bowell at Lowell's Anderson Mesa Station in Flagstaff, Arizona, was named after him in honor of his contributions to cometary science.

In 2008, he received the Gerard P. Kuiper Prize. He died on May 29, 2017 at the age of 76.

Honors

Awards 
 NASA Exceptional Scientific Achievement Medal (2006)
 Gerard P. Kuiper Prize (2008)
 NASA Exceptional Scientific Achievement Medal (2012)
 Gauß-Professur (2014)
 NASA Exceptional Public Service Medal (2017)

Eponym 
 3192 A'Hearn, an asteroid of the inner main-belt named after A'Hearn

References

External links 
 Michael F. A'Hearn's homepage
 Kuiper Prize website of the American Astronomical Society
 Nasa bio on Deep Impact website
 NASA EPSM award website

1940 births
2017 deaths
American astronomers
Morrissey College of Arts & Sciences alumni
Place of birth missing
University of Maryland, College Park faculty
University of Wisconsin–Madison College of Letters and Science alumni